Dyskolos Keros Ya Pringipes (Greek: Δύσκολος Καιρός Για Πρίγκιπες) is the name of the debut album of the Greek musical group Onirama. The album was released on December 7, 2005 by Lyra Records.

Track listing 
 "Intro" – 0:59
 "Dyskolos Keros Ya Prinkipes" (A tough time for princes) – 3:40
 "O Horos (Klise Ta Matia)" (The dance [Close your eyes]) – 3:49
 "Mia Zoe Tosi Micri" (A life so small) – 3:27
 "Mia Mera Tha 'Rthis" (One day you'll come) – 3:56
 "Yi Ke Ouranos" (Earth and sky) – 4:16
 "O Paradisos Ine Makria" (Paradise is far away) – 3:21
 "Stigmes" (Moments) – 2:54
 "Lefka Domatia" (White rooms) – 2:48
 "Oniropayida" (Dreamcatcher) – 3:49
 "Metra Tis Meres" (Count the days) – 2:54
 "O Horos" (Club Mix) (The Dance [Club Mix]) – 4:06
 "O Horos" (Unplugged) (The Dance [Unplugged]) – 2:55
 "Outro"

Singles
"O Horos (Klise Ta Matia)"
"O Horos (Klise Ta Matia)" was the first single from the album, and became a radio hit.

"Mia Mera Tha 'Rtheis"
"Mia Mera Tha 'Rtheis" was the second single from the album, and also became a radio hit.

Personnel 

Thodoris Marantinis – vocals, acoustic guitar
Yorgos Kokonidis – electric guitar
Dimitris Kokonidis – drums
Dionysis Frantzis – bass
Kostas Karakatsanis – violin, harmonica
Christos Tresintsis – piano, vocals

References

Onirama albums
2005 debut albums